The Wayne County School District is a public school district in Wayne County, Georgia, United States, based in Jesup. It serves the communities of Jesup, Odum, and Screven.

The elementary schools in Jesup were formerly grade centers (in which different elementary school grades were divided into multiple campuses, so the district's entire student body went to the same schools), but by 2009-2010 they were scheduled to be K-5 neighborhood schools.

Schools
The Wayne County School District has a pre-K center, five elementary schools, two middle schools, a high school, and an academy school.

Elementary schools
 James E. Bacon Elementary School, Jesup
 Jesup Elementary School, Jesup
 Martha R. Smith Elementary School, Jesup
 Odum Elementary School, Odum
 Screven Elementary School, Screven

Middle schools
 Arthur Williams Middle School, Jesup
 Martha Puckett Middle School, Jesup

Private schools
 Wayne Christian Academy, Jesup

High school
 Wayne County High School, Jesup

Other schools
 Thomas P. James

References

External links

School districts in Georgia (U.S. state)
Education in Wayne County, Georgia